Mark Tacher Feingold (born 15 September 1977) is a Mexican actor, musician, vocalist, guitarist, and a television host. He began as a television host in 1996, and has starred in a reality show, TV series, and telenovelas including La Hija del Mariachi, Verano de amor, Alma de Hierro, Para Volver a Amar, Mujeres Asesinas, Triunfo del Amor, La Voz... México, Abismo de pasión, Qué pobres tan ricos, and Que te perdone Dios.

Biography
Mark Tacher was born in Mexico City, Mexico, D.F. Mark holds a degree in acting, has a background in music and singing, speaks three languages (Spanish, English and Hebrew), and has also modeled several brands of clothing and footwear.

He holds a degree in performance studies, obtained at Azteca CEFAT (El Centro de Formación de Actores para la Televisión) in Mexico (1997-1999). He studied music, guitar, singing, and DJ at Academia G. Martell in Mexico. From 2005-2006, Mark studied acting at Tecnicas de Perfeccionamiento Actoral, La Verdad sin Esfuerzo with the help from Prof. Nelson Ortega in Venezuela.

Mark made his television appearance as the host in Nintendomanía (1996-1998), then later appeared in Vision Real (1998), Atrévete (1999) and Ciclón Azteca (2003). He's also acted in theatrical plays, television series, Mexican telenovelas, and has hosted several television programs.

As well as acting in Mexican telenovelas, Mark also starred in telenovelas in Venezuela and Colombia. He received two awards, including best actor, in Venezuela for his role in Mujer con pantalones (2005). Mark is still known for his excellent acting in the Colombian telenovela La Hija del Mariachi (2006), a telenovela that was a great success in Colombia and which was also acclaimed internationally.

Filmography

Theater

Awards
Las Palmas de Oro - Círculo Nacional de Periodistas CINPE (National Circle of Journalists), Best Actor 2002.
Mara de Oro (Mujer con pantalones / Venezuela, Best Actor 2005)
Lo Mejor de Venezuela / Venezuela, 2005.

References

External links 
 

1977 births
Living people
Male actors from Mexico City
Mexican people of Romanian-Jewish descent
Mexican Jews
Mexican male film actors
Mexican male telenovela actors
20th-century Mexican male actors
21st-century Mexican male actors